Eukene Larrarte (born 13 September 1998) is a Spanish cyclist, who currently rides for UCI Women's Continental Team .

She initially played football, before switching to compete in cycling and joined the local team Gipuzkoa Ogi Berri.

In 2016, Larrarte won her first Spanish championship title, when she won the team pursuit together with Ane Iriarte, Ziortza Isasi and Irene Usabiaga. In 2017 she won the national Madison championship with Leire Olaberria, followed by successive titles in 2018 and 2019 with Tania Calvo. She also won the 2019 Spanish omnium championships. At the 2020 UEC European Track Championships, she finished fourth in the team pursuit with Iriarte, Isasi and Usabiaga.

At the 2021 UCI Track Cycling Nations' Cup, she achieved her first international success when she finished third in the elimination race. She also competed in the Madison, omnium and elimination race at the 2021 UCI Track Cycling World Championships.

Major results

2016
 1st  Team pursuit, National Track Championships
2017
 1st  Madison, National Track Championships (with Leire Olaberria)
2018
 1st  Madison, National Track Championships (with Tania Calvo)
2019
 National Track Championships
1st  Madison (with Tania Calvo)
1st  Omnium
2020
 1st  Madison, National Track Championships (with Tania Calvo)
2021
 National Track Championships
1st  Madison (with Tania Calvo)
1st  Omnium
1st  Elimination race

References

External links

1998 births
Living people
Spanish female cyclists
Spanish track cyclists
People from Tolosa, Spain
Sportspeople from Gipuzkoa
Cyclists from the Basque Country (autonomous community)
21st-century Spanish women